A's Doll House is the second extended play by South Korean singer Ailee. It was released on July 12, 2013, by YMC Entertainment and Neowiz Internet. The singles "U&I", "Rainy Day", and "No No No" were used to promote the EP with "U&I" being the title track.

Release
On July 12, 2013, Ailee released the album, A's Doll House, as well as the music video for "U&I".

The Japanese version of the song U&I is also the second single by Ailee in Japan, which was released on March 19, 2014.

Promotion
Promotions for the album started on July 12, on KBS's Music Bank. Ailee also promoted on Mnet's M! Countdown, MBC's Music Core and Show Champion, and SBS's Inkigayo in July. On July 24, Ailee won her first music show award for "U&I" on MBC Show Champion. Ailee also won 2 Music Bank awards.

Chart performance
The title track, "U&I" was number one on the Gaon Digital Chart for two weeks. "Rainy Day" peaked at thirty one whilst "No No No" peaked at twenty one on the Gaon Digital Chart, both during the week of July 14, 2013.

Track listing

Charts

Album chart

Sales and certifications

References

External links
  (YMCent)

Ailee EPs
2013 EPs
Dance-pop EPs
Contemporary R&B EPs
Korean-language EPs
YMC Entertainment EPs